On May 18, 2005, Major of the Chilean Army Patricio Cereceda, on a routine training mission, ordered 474 conscripts of the 17th Regiment of Los Ángeles to March 28km along the side of the Antuco volcano at altitudes of  and  in spite of some sergeants and corporals appeals to Cereceda to cancel the order on account of the bad weather conditions. Major Cereceda stayed back at a military mountain shelter.

Of the five companies sent, only one was wearing mountain survival gear and the soldiers, most of them teenagers, had been conscripted less than three months earlier.

As a storm struck five hours into the march, the conscripts were completely disoriented by a viento blanco (whiteout). Most of them were able to hike out or hole up in shelters, but the victims, 44 conscripts and one sergeant, died of hypothermia or exposure in the mountains.

Consequences

Political

It was the military's worst peacetime military disaster since 1927, when 12 Chilean cadets died in Alpatacal (Argentina), as they visited Argentina for the country's independence day.

After the tragedy prominent political figures called for the abolition of the compulsory military service.

Military
The Antuco military investigation sanctioned nine officers for their responsibility in a snow training that "never should have been carried out" Three career officers were forced to resign, six subordinates were officially reprimanded, and 10 soldiers were praised for their actions.

Major Patricio Cereceda, chief of the battalion, Lieutenant colonel Luis Pineda, and Colonel Roberto Mercado, commander of the regiment were forced to retire.  Beside the top officers, six junior officers received jail sentences ranging from two to ten days and punitive marks on their military records.

The Army Chief of Chile's Division III General Rodolfo González resigned as a matter of honor. In his resignation, the general assumed responsibility for the actions of his subordinates.

Judicial
Six of the men were also involved in a civilian inquiry but only Major Patricio Cereceda was sentenced to 5 years in the Punta Peuco Prison. He was released on parole on 3 November 2011, after 3 years and 9 months in prison.

Indemnification
The army announced a US$5,400 in life insurance, US$4,900 in reparations, and a monthly pension of about US$260 for the surviving dependents. The Supreme Court of Chile determined an indemnification of  US$560,000 for the 27 survivors (US$20,600 for each one)

See also

 The sinking of the Cazador, the largest death toll in Chilean military history in peacetime

References

External links
 El Mercurio
 Chile: Death of conscripts in blizzard-struck march could lead to sweeping changes in military

Political scandals in Chile
Military history of Chile
2005 in Chile
Mountaineering in Chile
May 2005 events in South America
History of Biobío Region